Mount Outram is a  mountain summit located in the Howse River Valley of Banff National Park, in the Canadian Rockies of Alberta, Canada. Its nearest higher peak is Mount Forbes,  to the southwest. Mount Outram can be seen from the Icefields Parkway southwest of Saskatchewan Crossing, with optimum photography conditions in morning light.

History

Mount Outram was named in 1920 for James Outram (1864-1925), a mountaineer who made numerous first ascents in the Canadian Rockies including Mount Assiniboine, Chancellor Peak,  Cathedral Mountain, and Mount Wilson.

The first ascent of the mountain was made in 1924 by F.V. Field, W.O. Field, and L. Harris, with guides Edward Feuz Jr. and J. Biner.

The mountain's name was officially adopted in 1924 by the Geographical Names Board of Canada.

Geology

Like other mountains in Banff Park, Mount Outram is composed of sedimentary rock laid down from the Precambrian to Jurassic periods. Formed in shallow seas, this sedimentary rock was pushed east and over the top of younger rock during the Laramide orogeny.

Climate

Based on the Köppen climate classification, Mount Outram is located in a subarctic climate zone with cold, snowy winters, and mild summers. Winter temperatures can drop below -20 °C with wind chill factors below -30 °C. In terms of favorable weather conditions, summer months are best for climbing. Precipitation runoff from Mount Outram drains into tributaries of the Howse River.

See also

List of mountains of Alberta
Geography of Alberta

References

External links
 Parks Canada web site: Banff National Park
 Weather forecast: Mount Outram
 Mt. Outram winter photo: Flickr

Outram
Outram
Outram